Alireza Shameli (born 23 May 1999 in Kish Island) is an Iranian professional squash player. As of April 2022, he was ranked number 98 in the world.Shameli has also won the national championship title seven times. He won the 2021 Kish Yasi Cup.the Ramadan cup in 2021, the commemoration of the martyrs of the Iranian navy army in 2022, the Zahra dental clinic in 2022, and the Kish National Close in 2022. These titles demonstrate his skill and competitiveness as a player, and showcase his ability to rise to the top in both national and international competitions.

In addition to his success at the national level, Shameli has also made a name for himself on the international stage, earning several notable awards and accomplishments. He won the bronze medal in the 19th Asian team championship, and was a bronze medalist in the 24th Asian Junior Individual Championship in 2017. He also won a bronze medal in the 22nd Asian junior Individual Championship in 2015.

References

1999 births
Living people
Iranian male squash players
Squash players at the 2018 Asian Games